Mario Martín Rielves (born 5 March 2004) is a Spanish amateur footballer who plays as a midfielder for Real Madrid Castilla.

Career statistics

Club

Honours
Real Madrid
FIFA Club World Cup: 2022

References

External links 
 Real Madrid profile
 
 
 

2004 births
Living people
Footballers from Castilla–La Mancha
Spanish footballers
Association football midfielders
Real Madrid Castilla footballers
Real Madrid CF players
Primera Federación players
Sportspeople from the Province of Toledo